Emissoras Pioneiras de Televisão (Broadcast Pioneers Television, in English), best known as EPTV, is a Brazilian network that is affiliated with  TV Globo. The network has four stations: three in São Paulo and one in Minas Gerais.

Stations

Notes

References

External links
Official website

Television networks in Brazil
TV Globo affiliates
Portuguese-language television networks
Television channels and stations established in 1979